The International Trade Association for Broadcast & Media Technology (IABM) is a non-profit trade organization, formerly known as International Association of Broadcasting Manufacturers, is the International Association for Broadcast & Media Technology Suppliers whose members represent over 80% of the broadcast and entertainment technology market's revenues. IABM facilitates the important networking and interaction between suppliers that shape and define the unique ecosystem of the broadcast and media technology industry.

References

External links

Broadcasting
Organizations with year of establishment missing